James Perkin may refer to:

James Perkin (academic), President of Acadia University
James Perkin (ice hockey), 2008–09 Bowling Green Falcons men's ice hockey season

See also
James Perkins (disambiguation)